The Dodo Horn ( also known as Dodo church is a historical and architectural monument in the monastic complex of David Gareja

History 
The church was founded by Dodo, one of David Gareja's students in the first half of the 6th century. Its history is directly linked to the general history of the monastery. In the thirteenth and eighteenth centuries the church was subjected to attacks by the Mongol dynasties, Teymurilar, Seljuks and Safavids, being sacked and abandoned repeatedly.

Architecture 
The church consists of a complex of caves of various periods (VI-XVIII centuries). The main hall dates from the 11th-13th centuries. Used as a sanctuary, the most important and ancient part of the small church is in the corner of the rock. 

The main hall of the church is decorated with frescoes of great historical and cultural importance. The fresco on the central altar illustrates the blessing of Jesus, holding a closed book with a Georgian alphabet in his left hand. Also shown are some of the archangels such as Michael and Gabriel, as well as cherubs.

References

Literature 

 Chubinashvili N., Peshcher Monastery, David Gareji, T., 1948.

Georgian Orthodox monasteries
Christian monasteries established in the 6th century